The 1993–94 Maltese Premier League was the 14th season of the Maltese Premier League, and the 79th season of top-tier football in Malta. It was contested by 10 teams, and Hibernians F.C. won the championship.

League standings

Results

References
Malta - List of final tables (RSSSF)

Maltese Premier League seasons
Malta
1993–94 in Maltese football